Spectrum Software was a software company based in California, whose main focus is electrical simulation and analysis tools, most notably the circuit simulator Micro-Cap. It was founded in February 1980 by Andy Thompson. Initially, the company concentrated on providing software for Apple II systems.

One of the earliest products was Logic Designer and Simulator. Released in June 1980, this product was the first integrated circuit editor and logic simulation system available for personal computers. In many ways it was the forerunner of the Micro-Cap products. Its primary goal was to provide a “circuit creation and simulation” environment for digital simulation.

In August 1981, the analog equivalent of the first program, Circuit Designer and Simulator, was released. Its integrated text editor created circuit descriptions for a simple, linear, analog simulator. September 1982 saw the release of the first Micro-Cap package as a successor to the Circuit Designer and Simulator. The name Micro-Cap was derived from the term Microcomputer Circuit Analysis Program.

As of July 4, 2019, the company has closed and the software is now free.

References

 Micro-CAP: An Analog Circuit Design System for Personal Computers
 Spice Programs: Computerized Circuit Analysis For Analog EEs
 Analysis of digital filters via SPICE-family programs
 Modeling IIj Noise in HEMTS with SPICE-Based Micro-Cap
 AC Analysis of Idealized Switched-Capacitor Circuits in Spice-Compatible Programs
 White Paper: A New Zobel Network for Audio
 Get more power with a boosted triode

External links
 Spectrum Software Homepage
 About Spectrum Software
 Micro-Cap Application Notes

Software companies based in California
Companies based in Sunnyvale, California
Defunct software companies of the United States